Tsuga is a genus of conifers.

Tsuga may also refer to:

Tsuga, Tochigi, a town in Japan
Tsuga Station, a railway station in Chiba, Japan
Tsuga Dam, a dam in Kōchi Prefecture, Japan
Japanese destroyer Tsuga (1920), a ship of the Imperial Japanese Navy
Kazuhiro Tsuga, Japanese businessman

See also
Iwami-Tsuga Station